Pedro Beltrán (died 1505) was a Roman Catholic prelate who served as Bishop of Tui (1487–1505) and Bishop of Ciudad Rodrigo (1485–1505).

Biography
In 1485, Pedro Beltrán was appointed during the papacy of Pope Innocent VIII as Bishop of Ciudad Rodrigo.
In 1487, he was appointed during the papacy of Pope Innocent VIII as Bishop of Tui.
He served as Bishop of Tui until his death in 1505.

See also 
Catholic Church in Spain

References

External links and additional sources
 (for Chronology of Bishops) 
 (for Chronology of Bishops) 
 (for Chronology of Bishops) 
 (for Chronology of Bishops) 

15th-century Roman Catholic bishops in Castile
16th-century Roman Catholic bishops in Spain
Bishops appointed by Pope Innocent VIII
1505 deaths